Carpenter Street School is located in Woodbury, Gloucester County, New Jersey, United States. The school was built in 1840 and was added to the National Register of Historic Places on August 21, 1997.

See also 
National Register of Historic Places listings in Gloucester County, New Jersey

References 

Defunct schools in New Jersey
National Register of Historic Places in Gloucester County, New Jersey
School buildings completed in 1840
School buildings on the National Register of Historic Places in New Jersey
Schools in Gloucester County, New Jersey
Woodbury, New Jersey
New Jersey Register of Historic Places
Greek Revival architecture in New Jersey
1840 establishments in New Jersey